Heterodera canadensis  is a plant pathogenic nematode.

References 

canadensis
Plant pathogenic nematodes
Nematodes described in 1979